Elizabeth Pipe-Wolferstan (1763-1845; also known as Elizabeth Jervis) was an English novelist and poet.

Life
Elizabeth Jervis was born in London in 1763 and spent her pre-marriage years in Leicestershire. Her father, Philip Jervis, was a successful silk-mill owner, and the family was comfortably seated at an estate in Netherseal. In 1796, she anonymously published a novel called Agatha; or a narrative of recent events. Reviews were, perhaps, unjustly critical of a new novel by a new novelist. The same year, on her birthday, she married Tamworth lawyer Samuel Pipe-Wolferstan. She published nothing further until after his death in 1820. At some time in the early nineteenth century, she taught schoolchildren in Tamworth, including her niece, another Elizabeth Jervis.

Agatha was translated into French, and, later, into Dutch, from the French edition. A Latin and French scholar, Pipe-Wolferstan wrote several slim volumes of poetry including the entertaining Fairy Tales in verse published in 1829. She is featured in the new University of Colorado Boulder online collection of woman Romantic poets.

Works
 Agatha; or, a Narrative of Recent Events, 3 vols, 1896
 The enchanted flute, with other poems : and fables from La Fontaine, 1823
 Eugenia; a poem, 1824
 The Fable of Phaeton, translated from Ovid, 1828
 Fairy tales, in verse, 1829.
 Old Stories Versified, 1842

References 

1763 births
1845 deaths
Writers from London
People from Leicestershire (before 1897)
People from Tamworth, Staffordshire